Hormurus polisorum, also known as the Christmas Island cave scorpion, is a species of troglobitic scorpion in the Hormuridae family. It is endemic to Australia’s Christmas Island in the eastern Indian Ocean. It was first described in 2001; at the time of its discovery, it was the first troglobitic scorpion species recorded for Australia, and the second outside the Americas. The scorpions are rare, blind, obligate cave-dwellers, and are restricted to only a few caves on Christmas Island.

References

 

 
polisorum
Scorpions of Australia
Cave arachnids
Fauna of Christmas Island
Animals described in 2001